Javier Bernardo Usabiaga Arroyo (20 August 1939 – 9 September 2018) was a Mexican businessman and politician from the National Action Party who served as Secretary of Agriculture during part of Vicente Fox's government. From 2009 to 2012 he served as Deputy of the LXI Legislature of the Mexican Congress representing Guanajuato.

References

1939 births
2018 deaths
Politicians from Guanajuato
People from Celaya
Members of the Chamber of Deputies (Mexico)
National Action Party (Mexico) politicians
Mexican Secretaries of Agriculture
21st-century Mexican politicians